The Double Dream of Spring (also known as Doppio Sogno di Primavera, 1915) is a painting by the Italian metaphysical painter Giorgio de Chirico.

The painting depicts apparently related but separate scenes. The scene on the left shows a statue of a man in a frock-coat from behind. The statue appears to be staring contemplatively into an open sky. The two scenes are separated in the middle by a wooden beam, perhaps part of an easel. Near the base of the beam is a blueprint drawing of an interior, in which large arches and a window open onto a landscape including the stick-like figures of two men meeting, and distant mountains. The scene on the right appears to be looking down on the same landscape from a slightly different angle. Above the landscape is the shape of the head of a tailor's dummy.

Similar dummies appear many times in de Chirico's work (cf. The Seer). This time the dummy's head looms over the landscape like a hot air balloon.

The title was used by John Ashbery for his 1970 book of poems.

Sources
Museum of Modern Art

Paintings by Giorgio de Chirico
Paintings in the collection of the Museum of Modern Art (New York City)
1915 paintings